The Alatyr is a river in Mordovia in Russia, and is Sura's left tributary. The Alatyr freezes up in November and stays icebound until April. The towns of Ardatov and Alatyr, are located on the Alatyr River.

References 

Rivers of Mordovia